Olean, Nebraska is the name of two unincorporated communities:

Olean, Colfax County, Nebraska
Olean, Valley County, Nebraska